The Women's 4 × 200 metre freestyle relay competition of the 2018 European Aquatics Championships was held on 7 August 2018.

Records
Prior to the competition, the existing world and championship records were as follows.

Results

Heats
The heats were started at 10:00.

Final
The final was started at 17:49.

References

Women's 4 x 200 metre freestyle relay